The Inevitable Album is a debut studio album by American drag performer Jinkx Monsoon, released by Sidecar Records on May 6, 2014.

Composition

The album has original tracks written for Jinkx Monsoon by her music collaborator Richard Andriessen. Fred Schneider is featured on two of the tracks. According to David Clarke of Broadway World, the tracks "come across as both a homogeneous and eclectic blend of music". The album was inspired by Bette Midler's debut studio album The Divine Miss M (1972) and torch songs by Marlene Dietrich and Peggy Lee, as well as Lady Rizo, Amanda Palmer, and Regina Spektor for the album.

"Ladies in Drag" was described by Clarke as a "gutsy and perfectly phrased re-tooling" of "The Ladies Who Lunch", a song from the Broadway musical Company written by Stephen Sondheim and introduced by Elaine Stritch. "What About Debbie" interpolates Joan Cusack's monologue from the movie Addams Family Values.

Reception
Broadway World's David Clarke described the "cleverly titled" album as "irresistible and altogether decadent", "dazzling and dizzying", and "a triumphant celebration of Jinkx Monsoon's gratifying personality and the delectable cabaret-inspired flavors that make this sensational performer tick". He named "Ladies in Drag", "My Heart Belongs to Daddy", "The Bacon Shake", "What About Debbie", and "A Song to Come Home To" as highlights, but acknowledged, "All of the songs standalone individually and as a cohesive whole, making it hard to single out favorites on the album." Furthermore, he wrote:

Track listing

References

2014 debut albums
Jinkx Monsoon albums